Boulenger is a surname, and may refer to:

 Benjamin Boulenger (born 1990), French footballer
 Edward George Boulenger (1888–1946), British zoologist, director of aquarium at London Zoo 
 George Albert Boulenger (1858–1937), Belgian-British zoologist and botanist, described over 2,000 species
 Hippolyte Boulenger (1837–1874), Belgian landscape painter
 Marcel Boulenger (1873–1932), French fencer

See also 
 Boulanger